Chongxian Subdistrict  is a subdistrict under the jurisdiction of Yuhang District, Hangzhou, Zhejiang Province, People's Republic of China.

Administrative divisions 
, it administers the following four residential communities and eleven villages:

Qiancun Community
Chonghang Community
Chongwen Community
Yangjiabang Community
Chongxian Village
Xiangyang Village
Da'an Village
Zhanqiao Village
Yalan Village
Beizhuang Village
Lujiaqiao Village
Sanjia Village
Yanshan Village
Siwei Village
Longxuan Village

Geography 
Chongxian Subdistrict is bordered to the west by China National Highway 320 to the east and the Grand Canal to the west. It is 12 kilometers away from the city center of Hangzhou.

Economy 
It has the largest poultry and egg production base in Hangzhou. It has cultivated high-quality agricultural products such as "Sanjiacun" lotus root noodles and "Shunfengxiang" egg products, and has taken the lead in establishing professional aquatic crop cooperatives and professional poultry and eggs cooperatives in the whole district.

In 2004, the town achieved an agricultural output value of 230 million yuan, and the per capita income of farmers reached 8,620 yuan.

See also
List of township-level divisions of Zhejiang

References

Township-level divisions of Zhejiang
Yuhang District